Cyclopregnol (INN), also known as neurosterone, as well as 6β-hydroxy-3:5-cyclopregnan-20-one, is a synthetic pregnane steroid which was developed in the 1950s as a "psychotropic agent" for the treatment of mental disorders but was never marketed. Although an initial small clinical study found effectiveness, a subsequent, larger and more rigorous study found that cyclopregnol was no more effective than placebo and was clearly inferior to chlorpromazine.

See also
 List of neurosteroids

References

Secondary alcohols
Ketones
Neurosteroids
Pregnanes
Psychoactive drugs